Belapur Assembly constituency  is one of the 288 Vidhan Sabha (Assembly) constituencies of Maharashtra state in Western India.

Members of Legislative Assembly

Election results

2019 result

2014 result

2009 result

2004 result

1999 result

References 

Assembly constituencies of Maharashtra
Assembly constituencies of Thane district
Navi Mumbai